Sir Jacobus Arnoldus Combrinck Graaff  (4 March 1863 – 5 April 1927), also known as 'Sir James', was a South African cabinet minister, Senator, businessman, and South African Party whip.

Jacobus Graaff, younger brother of Sir David Graaff, was born on the Wolfhuiskloof farm near Villiersdorp in 1863.  Following his father's death in 1875, he left Villiersdorp to work with his brother David at the Combrinck & Co. butchery in Cape Town.  In partnership with his brother he took over the business in 1881. In 1899 he and his brother co-founded and was a partner in the Imperial Cold Storage and Supply Company.

He was chairman of the Afrikaner Bond's Cape Town branch and was elected to the Legislative Council representing the northwestern Cape in 1903.  After the Union of South Africa was formed in 1910, he became a senator. From 1913 to 1920, he was minister without portfolio in Louis Botha's cabinet. He was minister of public works, posts and telegraphs in Jan Smuts's second ministry.  He was knighted as a Knight Commander of the Order of St Michael and St George (KCMG) in 1917.

In 1907, Jacobus and his brother made a GB£100,000 donation (equivalent to £41,100,000 or R471,195,167 in 2010) for the establishment of the De Villiers Graaff High School in Villiersdorp.

He lived in a large mansion, Bordeaux, on the beach front in Sea Point.  Graaffs Pool, the walled off ocean backed tidal pool at Bordeaux, was bequeathed by Graaff to the City of Cape Town and is now a notable point of interest in the area. Graaff was regarded as an expert on animals as well as an eccentric, earned the moniker "Mal Jan" (crazy Jan).

Graaff was buried on his estate in Bellevue, Portervilleweg. He insisted on being buried in a coffin with a glass lid and a working telephone in case he woke from the dead.

See also

 Imperial Cold Storage and Supply Company
 Meat packing industry

External links

Messrs. Combrinck & Co.'s New Cold Storage Depot (The Cape Town Guide 1897)
Messrs. Combrinck & Co.'s New Cold Storage Depot (The Cape Town Guide 1897) cont.

References

1863 births
1927 deaths
People from the Western Cape
Afrikaner people
Government ministers of South Africa
Communications ministers of South Africa
Members of the House of Assembly (South Africa)
Jacobus Arnoldus
South African Knights Commander of the Order of St Michael and St George
South African philanthropists